Bastilla maturescens is a moth of the family Noctuidae first described by Francis Walker in 1858. It is found in the Indian subregion, Indochina, Thailand, Sumatra, Java and Borneo.

References

External links

Bastilla (moth)
Moths of Asia
Moths described in 1858